Askill is a small Gaeltacht village in Achill, County Mayo, Ireland. It is surrounded by Dooniver and Bunacurry.

See also
 List of towns and villages in Ireland

Villages in Achill Island
Gaeltacht towns and villages